The American Chamber of Commerce in Kyrgyzstan was founded in cooperation with the US State Department in 2005 to promote and support the development of international and especially American business in Kyrgyzstan.

It is the belief of the American Chamber of Commerce that the economic interests of the international and American business community and those of the people of Kyrgyzstan are one.

See also
 Chamber of commerce
 United States Chamber of Commerce

External links
 American Chamber of Commerce in Kyrgyzstan

American Chambers of commerce
Economy of Kyrgyzstan